Stacy Longstreet is an art director who has worked primarily on role-playing games.

Career
Stacy Longstreet was part of the SCRAMJET team, led by Richard Baker, with designers James Wyatt, Matthew Sernett, Ed Stark, Michele Carter, and Chris Perkins; this team was responsible for updating the fictional setting as it would be used for the fourth edition of Dungeons & Dragons which was in development.

References

External links
 

American art directors
Living people
Place of birth missing (living people)
Role-playing game artists
Year of birth missing (living people)